Jarrin Solomon (born 11 January 1986) is a Trinidadian track and field sprinter who specializes in the 400 metres. He was part of the Trinidad and Tobago team that won the bronze medal in the 4 × 400 m relay at the 2012 IAAF World Indoor Championships. Solomon also competed in the 2012 Summer Olympics, where his 4 × 400 m team again won the bronze medal.  He was also part of Trinidad and Tobago's 2014 Commonwealth Games 4 x 400 team, where they also won a bronze.

His personal best on the 400 m track is 44.98 s, set in 2014.

Solomon is a native of Albuquerque, New Mexico, United States, where he attended La Cueva High School and the University of New Mexico. His father, Mike Solomon, is from Trinidad and was also a 400 m sprinter.

In the summer of 2018, Solomon was a "flex" player for Godspeed, a flag football team made mostly of former professional American football players that participated in the American Flag Football League (AFFL). The team were crowned the champions of participating pro teams but lost in the final match to the amateur champion team.

References

External links

1986 births
Living people
Trinidad and Tobago male sprinters
Athletes (track and field) at the 2012 Summer Olympics
Athletes (track and field) at the 2016 Summer Olympics
Olympic athletes of Trinidad and Tobago
Track and field athletes from Albuquerque, New Mexico
Olympic bronze medalists for Trinidad and Tobago
Medalists at the 2012 Summer Olympics
Athletes (track and field) at the 2014 Commonwealth Games
World Athletics Championships athletes for Trinidad and Tobago
World Athletics Championships medalists
Commonwealth Games bronze medallists for Trinidad and Tobago
Pan American Games medalists in athletics (track and field)
Pan American Games gold medalists for Trinidad and Tobago
Olympic bronze medalists in athletics (track and field)
Commonwealth Games medallists in athletics
Athletes (track and field) at the 2015 Pan American Games
World Athletics Indoor Championships medalists
World Athletics Championships winners
Medalists at the 2015 Pan American Games
Central American and Caribbean Games medalists in athletics
Medallists at the 2014 Commonwealth Games